Shooks Run is a stream in the U.S. state of West Virginia. It is a tributary to the Tygart Valley River.

Shooks Run was named after Monus Shook, a pioneer citizen.

References

Rivers of West Virginia
Rivers of Barbour County, West Virginia